Mark Wagner may refer to:
Mark Wagner (baseball) (born 1954), former Major League Baseball player
Mark Wagner (artist) (born 1976), American artist, writer, publisher
 Mark Wagner (musician) (born 1984), American Christian musician